The Wasit governorate election of 2009 was held on 31 January 2009 alongside elections for all other governorates outside Iraqi Kurdistan and Kirkuk.

Results 

In March, the State of Law Coalition was rumoured to have allied with the Independent Free Movement List and the Iraqi National List.

|- style="background-color:#E9E9E9"
! style="text-align:left;vertical-align:top;" |Coalition !! Allied national parties !! Seats (2005) !! Seats (2009) !! Change !!Votes!! Percentage !! Party Leader
|-
| style="text-align:left;" |Shi’ite Political CouncilState of Law Coalition || Islamic Dawa Party || rowspan=2|4  || 13 || rowspan=2|+15 || 47,835 || 15.42% || Nouri al-Maliki
|-
| style="text-align:left;" |Shi’ite Political CouncilAl Mihrab Martyr List ||  Islamic Supreme Council of Iraq  || 6 || 30,712 || 9.90% || Abdul Aziz al-Hakim
|-
| style="text-align:left;" |Iraqi Elites GatheringIndependent Free Movement List || Sadrist Movement || 31 || 3 || -28 || 18,261 || 5.89% || Muqtada al-Sadr
|-
| style="text-align:left;" |Iraqi National List ||    || -|| 3 ||+3 || 14,596 || 4.71% || Ayad Allawi
|-
| style="text-align:left;" |Iraqi Constitutional Party ||    || -||3 ||+3 || 12,235 || 3.94% || Jawad al-Bulani
|-
| style="text-align:left;" |Gathering of the Independents in Wasit ||    || 3||- ||-3 ||  ||  ||
|-
| style="text-align:left;" |Iraqi Communist Party ||    || 2||- ||-2||  || ||
|-
| style="text-align:left;" |Democratic Iraq Gathering ||    || 1||- ||-1||  || ||
|-
| style="text-align:left;" colspan=2 |Total || 41 || 28 || -13|| 310,194 || 100% ||
|-
|colspan=5|Sources: this article - 
|}

References 

2009 Iraqi governorate elections